See Forever Eyes is the second studio album by the Canadian rock band Prism. It was originally released in 1978 by GRT. The album was recorded over a period of five months in 1978, at Mushroom Studios, Vancouver, at Little Mountain Sound Studios, Vancouver, and at Pinewood Studios. It was produced by the future multi-award winning producer Bruce Fairbairn.

The album was received negatively by music critics, while other reviewers noted good points to the album. It was also a commercial failure, peaking at number 158 on the Billboard 200. However, Prism found some moderate success with the song "Flyin'". The single peaked at 53 on the US Billboard Hot 100.

Composition
The songs "N-N-N-No!" and "You're Like The Wind" were both credited to Jim Vallance under the pseudonym Rodney Higgs as their songwriter. Their bassist Allan Harlow contributed two songs, "Flyin'" and "Take Me Away". Their keyboardist John Hall and guitarist Lindsay Mitchell joined together to write the title track "See Forever Eyes".

Track listing
 "Hello" (Clifford "Skip" Prest, Ken McColl) - 2:48
 "Flyin'" (Al Harlow) - 4:33
 "Nickels and Dimes" (Lindsay Mitchell, Harlow) - 4:08
 "Crime Wave" (Mitchell) - 4:35
 "You're Like The Wind" (Rodney Higgs) - 3:44
 "N-N-N-No!" (Higgs) - 2:51
 "Take Me Away" (Harlow) - 3:17
 "You're My Reason" (Michael Koren) - 3:36
 "Just Like Me" (Harlow, Mitchell, Rocket Norton, John Hall, Ron Tabak) - 4:40
 "See Forever Eyes" (Mitchell, Hall) - 5:10

Personnel
Prism
 Ron Tabak - lead vocals 
 Lindsay Mitchell - guitars, backing vocals
 Rocket Norton - drums
 John Hall - keyboards, backing vocals
 Al Harlow - bass guitar, rhythm guitar, backing vocals

Production
 Producer: Bruce Fairbairn
 Engineers: Rolf Hennemann, Keith Stein, Jefferson Turner
 Assistant engineers: Roger Monk, Jeff Tolman
 Art direction: James O'Mara
 Photography: Peter Beard, James O'Mara
 Management: Bruce Allen, Bruce Fairbairn

Sales and chart performance

Peak positions
Album - Billboard (United States)

Singles - Billboard (United States)

Certifications

References

External links
 Prism Official website 
 Amazon Music website

Prism (band) albums
1978 albums
Albums produced by Bruce Fairbairn